The Ministry of Foreign Affairs and East African Cooperation is a government ministry of Tanzania. The ministry is headed by Liberata Mulamula, and its offices are located at Mtumba in Dodoma.

History
The ministry of foreign affairs was set up following Tanganyikan independence in 1961, but until 1963, it was a department of the prime minister's office with Oscar Kambona as the first minister. The ministry of external affairs was created in 1964 with Stephen Mhando as its first minister. The name of the ministry has been changed three times since 1975, first to foreign affairs and then to the Ministry Foreign Affairs and International Cooperation.

John Magufuli merged the Ministry of East African Cooperation into the department, renaming it to the Ministry of Foreign Affairs and East African Cooperation.

List of Ministers

See also
 List of heads of missions of Tanzania
 List of diplomatic missions of Tanzania
 List of diplomatic missions in Tanzania

References

External links
 

Tanzania
Foreign relations of Tanzania